Kazi Khademul Islam (31 January 1925 – 28 March 1990) is a Bangladesh Awami League politician and the former Member of Parliament of Jessore-1.

Career
Islam was elected to parliament from Jessore-1 as a Bangladesh Awami League candidate in 1973.

References

Awami League politicians
1925 births
1990 deaths
1st Jatiya Sangsad members